John Jay Science and Engineering Academy is a magnet school in San Antonio, Texas (United States) which provides an academic education in a digital environment. Students and teachers pursue research projects that are collaboratively designed to develop critical thinking, technological competence, and academic achievement. The Academy is a "school within a school" sharing the campus of John Jay High School with a mission to provide students with a curriculum in science, engineering, math, and technology that will prepare them for further study and careers in science and engineering.

The instructional program of the Science & Engineering Academy aims to ensure a thorough education in science, engineering, and mathematics.  Students are required to take four science and math courses each of their four years of high school, which allows them to graduate with a cumulative total of 26 credits.  Students are encouraged to explore a variety of learning modes within the curriculum. Options include Independent Study, Research, Seminars, and the Internship program. The focus on science and engineering is enhanced by the availability of computers, laboratory facilities, independent research, mentors, field trips, summer internships, and opportunities for special projects.

In 2012 the expulsion of one of the school's students for not complying with the school district's Student Locator Project attracted publicity.

The Principal of the Academy is Teresa Cuellar, and the Vice Principal is Crystal Mitchell.

In 2009, the school was rated "academically acceptable" by the Texas Education Agency.

NCSSSMST
The John Jay Science and Engineering Academy has been an affiliate member of the National Consortium for Specialized Secondary Schools of Mathematics, Science and Technology since 1997.  Over the years, students and faculty have participated in Student Conferences, Science Research Symposium, and Professional Conferences at schools, colleges and universities throughout the country.

Extra-curricular student activities
Students are required to do a science fair research project for both freshman and sophomore years of their education.  In the students junior and senior year they then have the choice between Science Fair, History Fair, ACE Mentorship, Independent Study Mentorship (ISM), or Robotics. It is encouraged for students to take part in one or more extra-curricular activities relating to research, engineering, and social sciences. Among these are the Science Fair Research Team, History Fair Research Team, Academic Decathlon Team, Science UIL Team, Model United Nations Team, World Quest Team, and Robotics Team.

The school is also home to a fine arts program.

The AFJROTC is a program both locally and nationally.

The John Jay Robotics Team is the robotics team at John Jay Science and Engineering Academy. The team participates in two competitions annually. The first of which is BEST (Boosting Engineering Science and Technology). In this competition the team is given a box of supplies and 6 weeks to build a robot with limited supplies provided by BEST. In addition to Robotics at the best competition there are many other aspects of competition that are weighted more heavily than the actual robot.  These categories are Project Engineering Notebook, Marketing Presentation and Team Exhibit and Interviews. The official team number is 46. The second competition is FRC (FIRST Robotics Competition). In this competition the team is given another 6 weeks to build a robot, but with fewer restrictions on supplies.  These robots must cooperate and compete with other robots on the field during competition. The robot must be able to score points in accordance with that years particular competition. There are many other aspects to this competition like Chairman's Award, Entrepreneurship Award, FIRST Dean's List Award and Safety Animation Award. The Teams official name for FIRST is Team Orion and the number is 3240.

References

External links 
 John Jay Science and Engineering Academy

High schools in San Antonio
Public high schools in Bexar County, Texas
Northside Independent School District high schools
Magnet schools in Texas
Educational institutions established in 1997
1997 establishments in Texas